Steve Ross may refer to:

 Steve Ross (artist) (born 1966), son of Bob Ross
 Steve Ross (director) (born 1949), American film director
 Steve Ross (businessman) (1927–1992), American businessman and CEO of Time Warner, and member of the National Soccer Hall of Fame
 Steve Ross (basketball) (born 1980), Canadian basketball player
 Steven Ross (born 1993), Scottish footballer
 Stevie Ross (born 1965), Scottish footballer
 Steve Ross (cabaret singer) (born 1938), American cabaret singer and pianist
 Steven T. Ross (1937–2018), American military historian
 Stephan Ross (1931–2020), Polish-American holocaust survivor

See also
Stephen Ross (disambiguation)